The Battle of Bukgwan was a confrontation between Joseon and Japanese forces in Hamgyong province, Joseon from 20 September 1592 to 28 February 1593. During the battle, the "Righteous army" (a civilian militia) led by Jeong Mun-bu executed rebels and repelled the Japanese army.

Background
The Japanese 2nd Army, led by Katō Kiyomasa, captured Hanyang in May 1592. The 2nd Army then marched on Hamgyong province. At the time, the residents of Hamgyong were discriminated against by the Joseon government leading to wide spread opposition . The hostility they felt escalated when Prince Imhae and Sunhwa plundered the province of clothes, foods, and other necessities. Guk Gyeong-in and his uncle Guk Se-pil handed the two princes over to the Japanese. There was a rise in civil unrest due to Japanese exploitation of the residents Ji Dal-won sensed the change of popular opinion and asked Jeong Mun-bu, who had been hiding, to form and lead a righteous army. Jeong Mun-bu accepted the proposal and raised an army. The army went on to take and hold Kyongsong where Guk Se-pil was stationed. Mun-bu then issued a declaration calling for all to join the army. Jeong Hyeon-ryong, Oh Eung-tae, and other soldiers joined the newly formed army.

Battle

Execution of Rebels
In response to the occupation of Kyongsong by the righteous army the Japanese detached 100 scout forces to survey the situation. Thereupon, Kang Mun-woo and his cavalry repelled them. Jeong Mun-bu executed Guk Se-pil before the planned retaking of Kilju. Mun-bu posted a notice stating a righteous army had been raised and called for the execution of rebels including Guk Gyeong-in and Jeong Mal-su. Shin Se-jun, a student of Confucianism living in Hoeryong, set fire to the house of Guk Gyeong-in and killed him. During a peasant revolt Jeong Mal-su was killed. Jeong Mun-bu then ordered Gu Hwang and Kang Mun-woo to recapture Myongchon, which they did.

Battle of Kilju
Jeong Mun-bu besieged Kilju splitting his troops into groups of three. In late October 1592, Jeong Mun-bu ambushed the Japanese army who were returning from a nearby town that they had looted and slaughtered its residents. The Japanese in Kilju closed the fortress and reinforced their defence. Jeong Mun-bu surrounded them and prevented them from getting firewood. Around December, Jeong Mun-bu defeated the Japanese reinforcements in Ssangpo. On 19 January 1593, the isolated Japanese force tried to escape but their attempt failed when they were ambushed. On 22 January, Jeong Mun-bu and his 200 cavalry troops attacked and delivered a devastating blow to the Japanese army in Tanchon, south of Kilju. Kato Kiyomasa received a report that Kilju was in danger and marched north, leading over 20,000 soldiers. Jeong Mun-bu withdrew his forces from Tanchon after Kiyomasa crossed Macheollyeong. Jeong Mun-bu ambushed Kato and his troops in Immyong but failed and withdrew. Kato met the isolated army and retreated to Anbyon that night.

Aftermath
Kiyomasa rescued isolated units and assembled his troops in Hamhung on 20 February and retreated to Anbyon. On 29 February, Kato arrived at Hanyang and saw they lost 8,864 of 22,000 soldiers and decided to retreat. After the retreat of the Japanese, the righteous army disbanded and Yoon Tak-yeon took command. There was friction between Jeong Mun-bu and Yoon Tak-yeon, who took undue credit for the victory. Jeong Mun-bu was credited only for executing rebels.

See also
Pukkwan Victory Monument

References

Bibliography

 

Battles of the Japanese invasions of Korea (1592–1598)
1592 in Asia
1593 in Asia
1592 in Japan
1593 in Japan
Conflicts in 1592
Sieges involving Korea